Alibekov is a surname. Notable people with the surname include:

Akhmed Alibekov (born 1998), Ukrainian footballer
Jamil Alibekov (1927–2014), Azerbaijani writer
Ken Alibek (born 1950), Soviet physician, microbiologist and biological warfare expert
Mutalip Alibekov (born 1997), Russian footballer
Omargadzhi Alibekov (born 1996), Russian footballer